The  is Japanese aerial lift line in Shibukawa, Gunma. The ropeway connects the onsen group of the Shibukawa Ikahomachi district to the summit of Mount Monokiki and park facilities of Mount Kaminoyama.

Description

The Ikaho Ropeway is owned and operated by City of Shibukawa. The ropeway operates between 8:40 am and 5:15 pm, and runs every day of the year, with the exception of days for maintenance and inspection.

Basic data

System: Aerial tramway, 3 cables
Cable length: 
Vertical interval: 
Passenger capacity per cabin: officially listed as 21 passengers, frequently listed as 20 passengers
Stations: 2
Frequency: Every ten minutes (8:40 am - 10 am), every 15 minutes (10 am - 5:15 pm)
Final ascent: 5 pm, final descent: 5:15 pm
Time required for single ride: 4 minutes
Address (base station): 588-2 Ikahochō, Shibukawa City, Gunma Prefecture 〒377-0102

Stations

Base station

. Base station.  The first floor of the station serves a tourism information center, and the ropeway begins on the fourth floor. A visitor center, Michi no Eki Furusato Kōtsūkan, is adjacent to Hototogisu Station and sells vegetables and locally made soba buckwheat noodles, a noted product of the Shibukawa area. The station is named after the lesser cuckoo, which appears frequently in classical Japanese poems, prose, and visual works, notably the Pillow Book (1102 AD) of Sei Shonagon.

Summit station

. Summit station. The station allows access to skating center, Mount Kaminoyama, Mount Kaminoyama Park. The  at Kaminoyama Park provides broad views of nearby mountains and the Kantō Plain.

See also
List of aerial lifts in Japan

External links
Another Ropeway in Japan
渋川市・伊香保ロープウェイ
渋川市観光協会・伊香保温泉

References

Aerial tramways in Japan